Dimitris Kolovos (born 27 April 1993) is a Greek professional footballer who plays as an attacking midfielder or a winger for Super League club Panetolikos.

Club career

Panionios
Kolovos entered in football by signing in PAS Oropos in the local league of Athens. Playing with PAS Oropos since the beginning of 2009–10 season, he succeeded to win the amateurs' championship in 2009 and promoted in the Delta Ethniki. As his talent became known among the professional teams, needs only a year to sign with  Panionios in the Superleague. At the beginning he was a member of the U-20 team who took the 3rd place in the U-20 Greek Championship of 2012. At the same time he played mostly as a reserve with the first team . At the beginning of 2012–13 season under the coaching of Dimitrios Eleftheropoulos became a full-time member of the team, ensuring the interest of the Italian club Bologna, as well as the interest of the Greek giants AEK and PAOK.

Renowned for its pervasiveness and breaking the dribble . Considered among the most promising new talents of the club. He is seen as one of the most promising players of Panionios and the team reportedly rejected a €250,000 transfer offer from Fiorentina during the January transfer period of 2012. In May 2012, he renewed his contract with the club until 2016. In August 2013 he signed with the Greek champions Olympiacos for a total transfer €750,000, but it is decided to play for one year in his former team Panionios.

Olympiacos
On 26 September 2015, he made his debut with Olympiacos in a 5–1 home win over PAS Giannina replacing Sebá on second half. On 2 December 2015, he scored his first goal with Olympiacos in all competitions in a 4–0 away win against Panegialios in the Greek Cup. On 7 January 2016, he scored in a 4–1 away win against Chania in the Greek Cup. He finished his first season with the champions having 11 appearances(2 goals, 1 assist) in all competitions.

On 15 June 2016, Kolovos signed a long season loan from Olympiakos with Belgian Pro League club KV Mechelen. On 29 July he made his debut as a late substitute in a 2–0 home loss against Club Brugge.
On 10 September, Kolovos netted his first ever Mechelen goal to cap off a 2–0 home victory against Sint-Truidense in Round 6 of the Belgian Pro League. On 22 October 2016, he netted with the head, the second goal sealing a 2–0 home win against Mouscron. On 10 December, he opened the score in a 4–1 away win against Royal Excel Mouscron. On 22 January 2017, he equalized the score in a 2–1 home loss against Westerlo. On 18 February, he scored giving a 2–0 lead to his club against Lokeren but only six minutes later due to a cruciate ligament rupture, after contesting the ball with fellow countryman Georgios Galitsios of Lokeren, he has been substituted. A day later, Mechelen announced that Kolovos suffered a ruptured ACL on his right knee and will be sidelined for 6–8 months.

Mechelen
Kolovos is currently on loan at Mechelen from Olympiacos, but despite the injury the Belgian club are still interested in buying the player from the Greek club. On 8 May 2017, Mechelen announced that it has acquired Greek striker from Olympiacos on a three-years contract for a fee of €750,000.

After a very difficult period for the winger marred by injury (235 days to be exact), Kolovos returned to action in an away game against K.A.S. Eupen on 21 October 2017. After a mediocre season with Mechelen (played in 12 Jupiler League matches for Mechelen, failing to contribute with any goals or assists), Kolovos signed a long season contract with Dutch club Willem II on loan from Mechelen.

Omonia
On 28 December 2018, he agreed to join Omonia on an initial six-month loan deal, with a buy-out clause. On 19 January 2019, in his third appearance with the club was the MVP as he played as a substitute and scored a brace, giving David Ramírez an assist in a 3–1 home win game against Nea Salamis.

On 29 March 2019, Omonia bought the player from Mechelen, by activating the purchase option set by the two teams in December 2018, on a two-and-a-half-year contract for a fee of €120,000. The Cypriots had to decide what they would do before March 31, 2019 as many Greek and foreign clubs ask about the ownership status of the Greek international.

Panathinaikos
On July 18, 2019 Panathinaikos have confirmed the signing of a three-year contract with Greek international for an undisclosed fee. The Greek midfielder began to get back on track his career with Omonia in the second half of the 2018–19 season, contributing with four goals and one assist in 18 Cypriot First Division matches. Kolovos commented on his transfer to Panathinaikos: "I am very happy to become a member of the Panathinaikos family. This is a big club. I want to remain healthy in order to help the team achieve its goals. For me, Panathinaikos represents a great opportunity, and I want to prove that I can play at this level knowing how large this club is. I thank Mr. Dabizas and Mr. Donis for their belief which they have showed in me. I also express my thanks to the supporters who have sent me welcoming messages over the course of the past two days."

On 11 September 2020, Kolovos will continue his career with last year's Moldovan National Division champion FC Sheriff Tiraspol, on a long-season loan from Panathinaikos. At the end of the 2020-21 season with 12 goals (and 9 assists) in all competitions helped the club to win the 2020-21 title.

FC Sheriff Tiraspol
On 28 July 2021, Kolovos will continue his career in FC Sheriff Tiraspol, this time with a regular transfer, as he was released by mutual consent from Panathinaikos, for a year contract with an undisclosed fee. There was interest from Turkish and Israeli clubs, but he chose to join a team that plays in the UEFA Champions League qualifiers. 
On 17 August 2021, Kolovos with a volleyed strike gave Sheriff a dominant lead in a 3-0 home win game against GNK Dinamo Zagreb in the Champions League playoffs 1st round. On 25 September 2021, he scored a brace in a triumphic 7-0 away win against FC Dinamo-Auto Tiraspol.

Kocaelispor
On 1 February 2022,Kolovos will continue his career in Kocaelispor, with a regular transfer, as he was released by mutual consent from FC Sheriff Tiraspol, for a year-and-a-half contract with an undisclosed fee.

International career
Kolovos has a plural international career in youth Greece squads. On 9 November 2014 Greece head coach Claudio Ranieri announced the first call up of Kolovos (replaced injured Salpingidis) for the match against Faroe Islands. He made his international debut four days later in a friendly home match against Serbia.

On 19 March 2019, Greece head coach Angelos Anastasiadis announced the call up of Kolovos for the match against Liechtenstein and Bosnia and Herzegovina for UEFA Euro 2020.

On 26 March 2019, Kolovos heading home powerfully hit goal from a great Zeca right-wing cross in the 85th minute equalizing in a 2–2 finish against Bosnia and Herzegovina against 10-man Bosnia-Herzegovina at the Stadion Bilino Polje in Zenica in their second Euro 2020 qualifying match. It was his first goal with the national team.

International goals
Scores and results list Greece's goal tally first.

Honours
Olympiakos
Super League Greece: 2015–16

FC Sheriff Tiraspol
Divizia Națională: (2) 2020–21, 2021–22
Moldovan Cup: 2021–22, Runner-Up 2020–21
Moldovan Super Cup: Runner-Up 2021

Individual
Super League Greece Best Young Player of the Year: 2013–14

References

External links
 
 
 
 

1993 births
Living people
Footballers from Athens
Greek footballers
Association football midfielders
Association football wingers
Greece youth international footballers
Greece under-21 international footballers
Greece international footballers
Super League Greece players
Belgian Pro League players
Eredivisie players
Cypriot First Division players
Moldovan Super Liga players
TFF First League players
Panionios F.C. players
Olympiacos F.C. players
Panegialios F.C. players
K.V. Mechelen players
Willem II (football club) players
AC Omonia players
FC Sheriff Tiraspol players
Kocaelispor footballers
Panetolikos F.C. players
Greek expatriate footballers
Expatriate footballers in Belgium
Expatriate footballers in Cyprus
Expatriate footballers in the Netherlands
Expatriate footballers in Moldova
Expatriate footballers in Turkey
Greek expatriate sportspeople in Belgium
Greek expatriate sportspeople in Cyprus
Greek expatriate sportspeople in the Netherlands
Greek expatriate sportspeople in Moldova
Greek expatriate sportspeople in Turkey